Ecclesiastes 12 is the twelfth (and the final) chapter of the Book of Ecclesiastes in the Hebrew Bible or the Old Testament of the Christian Bible. The book contains philosophical speeches by a character called 'Qoheleth' ("the Teacher"), composed probably between the 5th and 2nd centuries BCE. Peshitta, Targum, and Talmud attribute the authorship of the book to King Solomon. This chapter continues the previous one in the sustained encouragement to make decision and the need to act speedily.

Text
The original text was written in Hebrew. This chapter is divided into 14 verses.

Textual witnesses
Some early manuscripts containing the text of this chapter in Hebrew are of the Masoretic Text, which includes Codex Leningradensis (1008).

There is also a translation into Koine Greek known as the Septuagint, made in the last few centuries BCE. Extant ancient manuscripts of the Septuagint version include Codex Vaticanus (B; B; 4th century), Codex Sinaiticus (S; BHK: S; 4th century), and Codex Alexandrinus (A; A; 5th century). The Greek text is probably derived from the work of Aquila of Sinope or his followers.

Structure
The New King James Version divides this chapter into two parts:
  = Seek God in early life
  = The whole duty of man
Weeks and Eaton see verses 1-8 as a continuation of chapter 11. Verses 9-14 constitute an epilogue to the whole book.

The urgency of decision (12:1–8)
This part reminds the people to look not only to the life of joy but also to its Creator. Verses 2–7 are considered to contain metaphorical and picturesque descriptions of the physical degeneration accompanying old age, until the end of life, depicted as the end of the world, all in one Hebrew sentence (verses 1-7). There is a Sumerian poem applying the same style to the same topic.

Verse 1
Remember also your Creator in the days of your youth, before the evil days come and the years draw near of which you will say, "I have no pleasure in them";
"Creator": provides a link to the creation in verse 7. The "evil" days are rendered as the "difficult" days by the New King James Version.

Verse 7

Then shall the dust return to the earth as it was: and the spirit shall return unto God who gave it.
This verse certainly depicts death, echoing ; .

Verse 8
Vanity of vanities, saith the preacher; all is vanity.
This verse and Ecclesiastes 1:2 with the same words form an inclusio, together framing the body of the book.

Epilogue (12:9–14)

This section provides an assessment and apology for Qoheleth and the book. The final admonition points to the conclusion in a formula establishing authority of the text, that one should fear God and obey God's commandments, as there will be judgment.

See also
 Related Bible parts: Job 9, Ecclesiastes 1

Notes

References

Sources

External links

 Jewish translations:
 Kohelet – Ecclesiastes - Chapter 12 (Judaica Press) translation [with Rashi's commentary] at Chabad.org
 Christian translations:
 Online Bible at GospelHall.org (ESV, KJV, Darby, American Standard Version, Bible in Basic English)
 Ecclesiastes Chapter 12 King James Version
  Various versions

12